William Steven Jackson (born July 1, 1960) is a former American football defensive back who played in the National Football League for one season. He played college football at North Carolina.

Professional career
Jackson was selected by the Cleveland Browns in the eighth round of the 1982 NFL Draft. He played nine games for the Browns in the 1982 season, in which he recovered one fumble.

References

External links
 Pro Football Archives bio

1960 births
Living people
American football defensive backs
North Carolina Tar Heels football players
Cleveland Browns players
People from Winston-Salem, North Carolina
Players of American football from North Carolina